"The Ballad of Jayne" is a 1989 power ballad by American glam metal band L.A. Guns from their 1989 album Cocked & Loaded. The song was said to have been written about actress and Playmate Jayne Mansfield( This has been debunked by Tracii Guns.) The song reached number 33 on the Billboard Hot 100 in 1990 and number 25 on the Billboard Mainstream Rock chart. The song was also slightly successful in the United Kingdom, reaching number 53 in 1991. It ranked number 93 on VH1's 100 Greatest One-Hit Wonders of the '80s in 2009.

Charts

References

1989 songs
1989 singles
Glam metal ballads
Mercury Records singles
Song recordings produced by Tom Werman
Vertigo Records singles
L.A. Guns songs